Investigation Discovery is a Canadian Discretionary service owned by Bell Media. Based on the U.S cable network of the same name, the channel focuses on true crime programming.

Originally launching as a Canadian version of Court TV, it was relaunched on August 30, 2010 under its current branding as part of a licensing arrangement with Warner Bros. Discovery.

History

As CourtTV Canada 
In November 2000, Learning and Skills Television of Alberta, a company majority owned by CHUM Limited (60%) and owners of Access, was granted permission by the Canadian Radio-television and Telecommunications Commission (CRTC) to launch a television channel called "The Law & Order Channel", described as "a national English-language Category 2 specialty television service that will feature entertainment programming about police, law, the courts, emergency and medical response teams, disaster and relief operations featuring people and organizations that uphold law and order in our society."

The channel was launched on September 7, 2001 as Court TV Canada. The channel replaced the American Court TV service, which was available on many television service providers throughout Canada as an eligible foreign service.

On February 15, 2005, CHUM completed the purchase of the remaining interest in LSTA, bringing its ownership to 100%. A year later, in July 2006, Bell Globemedia (later renamed CTVglobemedia) announced that it would purchase CHUM for an estimated CAD$1.7 billion, included in the sale was LSTA and its interest in CourtTV Canada. The sale and was approved by the CRTC in June 2007, and the transaction was completed on June 22, 2007. In 2008, LSTA (then known as Access Media Group) was wound up into CTV Limited (the renamed CHUM Limited).

As Investigation Discovery 
The original CourtTV was relaunched as TruTV in 2008, though the Canadian version continued to use the CourtTV branding. On August 30, 2010, CTV announced a new licensing agreement with Discovery Communications, under which Court TV Canada would be rebranded as a Canadian version of Discovery's true crime brand Investigation Discovery. It is the only Discovery-branded channel operated by Bell Media that neither Discovery, or ESPN Inc. (via CTV Specialty Television, Inc.), holds an ownership stake in.

On September 10, 2010, Bell Canada (a minority shareholder in CTVglobemedia) announced that it planned to acquire 100% interest in CTVglobemedia for a total debt and equity transaction cost of CAD$3.2 billion. The deal was approved by the CRTC on March 7, 2011, and was finalized on April 1 of that year, on which CTVglobemedia was rebranded Bell Media.

On June 17, 2011, Bell Media announced plans to launch a high definition simulcast feed of Investigation Discovery, titled Investigation Discovery HD, by the end of the year. The HD feed was launched on December 15, 2011 on Bell Fibe TV and later on Telus Optik TV; The HD feed later began to be carried on Bell Satellite TV on December 13, 2012, then Bell Aliant and NorthernTel in the mid 2010s. The HD feed was added to Shaw Direct's lineup on October 16, 2018. It is yet to be launched on Shaw Cable and some smaller providers.

Programming
The channel primarily airs true crime programming sourced from its U.S. parent network, including Fear Thy Neighbor (a co-production with the U.S. Investigation Discovery and French-Canadian sister network Canal D), Homicide Hunter, and On the Case with Paula Zahn.

References

External links
 

Digital cable television networks in Canada
Bell Media networks
Canada
Television channels and stations established in 2001
English-language television stations in Canada
2001 establishments in Canada